The , is a public university in Shizuoka City, Shizuoka Prefecture, Japan.

Overview 

The University of Shizuoka was created through the amalgamation of three former public universities in 1987 and was expanded to comprise five colleges. These are the School of Pharmaceutical Sciences, the School of Food and Nutritional Sciences, the Faculty of International Relations, the School of Administration and Informatics and the School of Nursing. In addition to the undergraduate programs offered in the various departments of these colleges, the university also maintains graduate schools consisting of the Graduate School of Pharmaceutical Sciences, the Graduate School of Nutritional and Environmental Sciences, the Graduate School of International Relations, the Graduate School of Administration and Informatics and the Graduate School of Nursing, as well as a variety of research institutes, inter-disciplinary centers and other research centers. The university also operates a two-year junior college, which is on a separate campus from the main university.

In 2011, the Graduate School of Management and Information was reorganized into the Graduate School of Management and Information of Innovation. In 2012, the Graduate School of Pharmaceutical Sciences and the Graduate School of Nutritional and Environmental Sciences were merged and reorganized into the Graduate School of Integrated Pharmaceutical and Nutritional Sciences, an educational organization, the Graduate Division of Pharmaceutical Sciences and the Graduate Division of Nutritional and Environmental Sciences, research organizations.

The University of Shizuoka is located in the prefectural capital of Shizuoka. Kusanagi Campus is near Kusanagi Station on the JR Tōkaidō Main Line, six minutes from Shizuoka Station. It is roughly halfway between the town centers of the former cities of Shimizu and Shizuoka (which were merged to form a single city in 2003). It forms an important part of a major cultural and educational complex which also includes Shizuoka Prefectural Central Library and Shizuoka Prefectural Museum of Art.

The Japanese name of the university is Shizuoka-ken ritsu Daigaku (静岡県立大学), which translates literally as "Prefectural University of Shizuoka." Since the English version of the Japanese term prefecture is unfamiliar to many English speakers, the university's English name was simplified to the "University of Shizuoka." This leads to some confusion, in English at least, since another nearby national university has a very similar name in English (that institution is ).

History

Pharmacy school (old school system) 

 was founded by Terukichi Iwasaki in 1916. It was a  that was an institution of higher education in the Empire of Japan.

In those days, pharmacy schools for women were very rare in the Empire of Japan. Iwasaki believed that higher education for women was important. Iwasaki ran Iwasaki Eye Clinic in Takajōmachi, Shizuoka City, Shizuoka Prefecture, and Shizuoka Women's School of Pharmacy established at this clinic building. Iwasaki became the Principal and was planning to move Shizuoka Women's School of Pharmacy to a new campus in Kawarabachō, Shizuoka City, Shizuoka Prefecture. But Iwasaki died suddenly in 1925.

Kōtarō Shinoda became the Principal in 1926. Shinoda revived Shizuoka Women's School of Pharmacy. Shinoda promoted the construction of the Main Building at Kawarabacho Campus. The Main Building was completed in 1930.

Specialized school (old school system) 
The specialized school was an institution of higher education in the Empire of Japan. In 1950, Shizuoka Women's College of Pharmacy was coeducational and became .

After the World War II, specialized schools under the old school system were required to transition to universities under the new school system. Shizuoka College of Pharmacy was run by a foundation, but its finances were unstable. To solve this problem, the College was transferred to Shizuoka Prefectural Government. In 1952, Shizuoka College of Pharmacy was transformed from a private specialized school to public specialized school and became .

University (now school system) 

On the other hand  was a new  founded by Shizuoka Prefectual Government in 1951. In addition,  was a new university founded by Shizuoka Prefectual Government in 1967.

In 1987, Shizuoka College of Pharmacy, Shizuoka Women's University and Shizuoka Women's College were merged to form the University of Shizuoka. On April 1, 2007, Shizuoka Prefectural University Corporation was established by Shizuoka Prefectural Government. Until March 31, 2007, the University of Shizuoka had been administrated by Shizuoka Prefectural Government, but since April 1, 2007, it has been administrated by Shizuoka Prefectural University Corporation. On December 10, 2018, Tasuku Honjo, Advisor to Shizuoka Prefectural University Corporation, received a medal and certificate for Nobel Prize in Physiology or Medicine.

Organization

Under graduate 

 School of Pharmaceutical Sciences
 Division of Pharmaceutical Sciences
 Division of Pharmacy
 School of Food and Nutritional Sciences
 Department of Food Science and Biotechnology
 Department of Nutrition and Life Sciences
 Department of Environmental and Life Sciences
 School of International Relations
 Department of International Relations
 Department of International Languages and Cultures
 School of Management and Information
 Department of Management and Information
 School of Nursing
 Department of Nursing

Graduate 

 Graduate School of Integrated Pharmaceutical and Nutritional Sciences
 Graduate Program in Pharmacy
 Graduate Program in Pharmaceutical Sciences
 Graduate Program in Pharmaceutical and Nutritional Sciences
 Graduate Program in Food and Nutritional Sciences
 Graduate Program in Environmental Health Sciences
 Graduate Division of Pharmaceutical Sciences
 Graduate Division of Nutritional and Environmental Sciences
 Graduate School of International Relations
 Division of International Relations
 Division of Comparative Culture
 Graduate School of Management and Information of Innovation
 Division of Management and Information of Innovation
 Graduate School of Nursing
 Division of Nursing

Library 
 University Library

Research institute 

 Health Support Center
 Information Technology Center
 Language and Communication Research Center
 Center for Promotion of Gender Equality
 Global Center for Asian and Regional Research
 Fuji-no-Kuni Center for Future Education
 Institute of Traditional Chinese Medicine, School of Pharmaceutical Sciences
 Medicinal Plant Garden, School of Pharmaceutical Sciences
 Center for Nursing Professional Development, School of Nursing
 Center for Drug Discovery, Graduate Division of Pharmaceutical Sciences
 Center for Pharma-Food Research, Graduate Division of Pharmaceutical Sciences
 Food and Environment Research Center, Graduate Division of Nutritional and Environmental Sciences
 Tea Science Center, Graduate Division of Nutritional and Environmental Sciences
 Center for Korean Studies, Graduate School of International Relations
 Wider Europe Research Center, Graduate School of International Relations
 Center for Global Studies, Graduate School of International Relations
 Center for Regional Management Studies, Graduate School of Management and Information of Innovation
 Center for Health Services Management Studies, Graduate School of Management and Information of Innovation
 Research Center for ICT Innovation, Graduate School of Management and Information of Innovation
 Tourism Research Center, Graduate School of Management and Information of Innovation

Administration Offices 
 Management Strategy Department
 General Affairs Department
 Education Research Promotion Department
 Student Affairs Department

Junior college 
 Department of Dental Hygiene
 Department of Social Welfare
 Division of Social Welfare
 Division of Care Welfare
 Department of Child Studies

Chronology 

 1916 - Shizuoka Women's School of Pharmacy was founded.
 1945 - Reorganized into Shizuoka Women's College of Pharmacy.
 1950 - Reorganized into Shizuoka College of Pharmacy.
 1951 - Shizuoka Women's College was founded.
 1952 - Reorganized into Shizuoka Prefectual College of Pharmacy.
 1953 - Reorganized into Shizuoka College of Pharmacy.
 1967 - Shizuoka Women's University was founded.
 1987 - University of Shizuoka was founded.

Chart

Chairmen of the board of directors

Presidents

Notable alumni and faculty members

See also 
 Shizuoka University – a national university in Shizuoka City, Shizuoka Prefecture, Japan

References

Notes

Sources

External links
静岡県公立大学法人 静岡県立大学 – Japanese Website.
UNIVERSITY OF SHIZUOKA – English Website.

University
University
Public universities in Japan
Educational institutions established in 1987
1987 establishments in Japan